Almost with You is a song by Australian band the Church, released as a single from their 1982 album The Blurred Crusade.

References

External links
 "Almost with You" at Allmusic.com
 "Almost with You" at Discogs.com

The Church (band) songs
1982 singles
1982 songs
Songs written by Steve Kilbey